Senator Castillo may refer to:

Miguel Pereira Castillo (born 1947), Senate of Puerto Rico
Susan Castillo (born 1951), Oregon State Senate